The men's slopestyle competition of the 2013 FIS Snowboarding World Championships was held in Stoneham-et-Tewkesbury, Quebec on January 17 & 18, 2013. 72 athletes from 26 countries competed.

Medalists

Results

Qualification
The following are the results of the qualification.

Final

References

Slopestyle, men's